E. P. Gopalan (1912 - 1 November 2001) was an Indian politician and leader of Communist Party of India. He represented Pattambi constituency in 1st and 5th Kerala Legislative Assembly and Perinthalmanna constituency in 2nd Kerala Legislative Assembly.

He entered politics in the 1930s participating in several local struggles; In 1939 he joined the Communist Party of India. In 1939, he spent 21 months in prison for preaching against the war. He has also served as the Malabar District Board Member, Palakkad District Karshaka Sangam President and the first Non-Official Chairman of Agro Industries.

He died on November 1, 2001.

References

1912 births
2001 deaths
Communist Party of India politicians from Kerala